The 2016 F4 Japanese Championship season was the second season of the F4 Japanese Championship. It began on 9 April in Okayama and finished on 13 November on Twin Ring Motegi after fourteen races held across six rounds.

Teams and drivers

Race calendar and results
All rounds were held in Japan and were part of the Super GT events. The Autopolis round, initially scheduled for May 22nd, has been cancelled in the aftermath of the 2016 Kumamoto earthquakes. On July 1, it was finally decided that one of the cancelled races will be held at the fourth round at Fuji and the other at the season finale at Motegi, both rounds becoming triple-header rounds.

Championship standings

Only the best thirteen results counts towards the championship. Points are awarded to the top 10 classified finishers in each race. No points are awarded for pole position or fastest lap.

Drivers' standings

Teams' standings

References

External links
  

Japanese F4 Championship seasons
Japanese
F4 Japanese Championship
Japanese Formula 4